Sylvain Francisco (born 10 October 1997) is a French professional basketball player for Peristeri of the Greek Basket League. He also represents the French national team in international competition. Francisco holds both French and American citizenship.

Biography and career 
Sylvain Francisco is of Angolan origin. He pursued his secondary education in Florida before joining the French Levallois Metropolitans in the French men's basketball first division. At the end of the 2017–2018 season, he signed his first professional contract with the Levallois club. However, wanting to join the G-League and eventually the NBA, he did not show up to the club's training the following summer. He finally signed with Paris Basketball in the LNB Pro B in December 2018. After two seasons with Paris Basketball, he returned to the French first division by signing with the Chorale Roanne for the 2020-2021 season.

Francisco left Roanne in June 2021, and signed with the Spanish club Manresa in Liga Endesa, end of August 2022. In the summer of 2022, he participated in the NBA Summer League with the Milwaukee Bucks. For the 2022-2023 season, he signed with Peristeri B.C. in Greece. On February 24, 2022, he landed his first selection with the French men's national basketball team for the World Cup 2023.

Club history 

 2017–2018 : Levallois Metropolitans (Pro A)
 2018–2020 : Paris Basketball (Pro B)
 2020–2021 : Chorale Roanne (Pro A)
 2021–2022 : Bàsquet Manresa (Liga Endesa)
 Since 2022 : Peristéri BC (ESAKE)

References 

Living people
1997 births
French men's basketball players
French expatriate basketball people in Greece
French expatriate basketball people in Spain
Peristeri B.C. players